Tassell is a surname. Notable people with the surname include:

Kris Tassell
Gustave Tassell (1926–2014), American fashion designer
Doug Tassell
Thomas Tassell Grant
Maiden name of Rebecca Welles

See also
Tassel (disambiguation)
Van Tassel
Van Tassell (disambiguation)